Spain competed at the 1976 Summer Olympics in Montreal, Quebec, Canada. 113 competitors, 103 men and 10 women, took part in 68 events in 14 sports.

Medalists

|  style="text-align:left; width:78%; vertical-align:top;"|

| width="22%" align="left" valign="top" |

Athletics

Men's 800 metres
 Andrés Ballbé
 Heat — 1:48.38 (→ did not advance)

Men's 10.000 metres
 Mariano Haro
 Heat — 28:11.66
 Final — 28:00.28 (→ 6th place)

 José Luis Ruiz
 Heat — 31:03.43 (→ did not advance)

Men's 4 × 100 m Relay 
 José Luis Sánchez Paraíso, Luis Sarriá, Francisco Javier García, and Javier Martínez
 Heat — 39.93
 Semi Final — DSQ (→ did not advance)

Men's Marathon
 Agustin Fernández — 2:28:37 (→ 46th place)
 Antonio Baños — 2:31:01 (→ 51st place)
 Santiago Manguan — did not finish (→ no ranking)

Men's High Jump
 Juan Carrasco
 Qualification — 2.05m (→ did not advance)

 Francisco Martín
 Qualification — 2.05m (→ did not advance)

Men's Long Jump
 Rafael Blanquer
 Qualification — 6.19m (→ did not advance)

Women's 800 metres
 Carmen Valero
 Heat — 2:06.14 (→ did not advance)

Women's 1500 metres
 Carmen Valero
 Heat — 4:17.65 (→ did not advance)

Boxing

Men's Light Flyweight (– 48 kg)
 Enrique Rodríguez
 First Round – Lost to Serdamba Batsuk (MGL), RSC-3

Men's Flyweight (– 51 kg)
 Vicente Rodríguez
 First Round – Bye 
 Second Round – Defeated Mbarek Zarrougui (MAR), RSC-2 
 Third Round – Lost to Jong Jo-Ung (PRK), 2:3

Men's Bantamweight (– 54 kg)
 Juan Francisco Rodríguez
 First Round – Bye 
 Second Round – Lost to Charles Mooney (USA), 1:4

Men's Lightweight (– 60 kg)
 Antonio Rubio
 First Round – Bye 
 Second Round – Lost to Reinaldo Valiente (CUB), 0:5

Men's Light Welterweight (– 63.5 kg)
 José Manuel Gómet
 First Round – Lost to Narong Boonfuang (THA), KO-1

Canoeing

Men's Competition
 Fernando Henríquez
 Guillermo Del Riego
 Herminio Menéndez
 José María Esteban
 José Ramón López 
 José Seguín
 Luis Gregorio Ramos

Cycling

Four cyclists represented Spain in 1976.

Individual road race
 Bernardo Alfonsel — 4:47:27 (→ 10th place) 
 Rafael Ladrón — 4:49:01 (→ 32nd place) 
 Juan José Moral — 4:49:01 (→ 33rd place) 
 Paulino Martínez — did not finish (→ no ranking)

Diving

 Carmen Belén Núñez
 Conchita García
 Ricardo Camacho

Equestrian

 Alfonso Segovia
 Eduardo Amorós
 José María Rosillo
 Luis Álvarez de Cervera

Football

Men's team competition
Preliminary round (group A)
 Lost to Brazil (1-2)
 Lost to East Germany (0-1)
→ did not advance

Team roster
 Alberto Vitoria 
 Antonio Olmo
 Cundi
 Enrique Saura 
 Esteban Vigo 
 Francisco Javier Bermejo 
 Francisco Sanjosé 
 Isidoro San José
 Mariano Pulido 
 José Vicente Sánchez
 Juan Castillo 
 Juan Gómez 
 Luis Arconada
 Miguel Mir
 Pedro Camus 
 Santiago Idigoras

Gymnastics

Men's Competition
 Fernando Bertrand
 Gabriel Calvo
 José de la Casa

Women's Competition
 Elisa Cabello
 Eloisa Marcos
 Mercedes Vernetta

Hockey

Men's team competition
Preliminary round (group B)

 Defeated West Germany (4-1)
 Drew with Pakistan (2-2)
 Drew with New Zealand (1-1)
 Lost to Belgium (2-3)
Play-Off Match Group B
 Lost to New Zealand (0-1, after extra time)
Classification Matches
 5th-8th place: Defeated Malaysia (2-1)
 5th-6th place: Lost to West Germany (1-9) → 6th place

Team roster
 Agustín Churruca
 Agustín Masana
 Francisco Codina
 Francisco Fábregas
 Francisco Segura
 Jaime Arbós
 Jorge Fábregas
 José Sallés
 Juan Amat
 Juan Arbós
 Juan Colomer
 Juan Pellón
 Luis Alberto Carrera
 Luis Twose
 Ramón Quintana
 Ricardo Cabot
Head coach: Horst Wein

Judo

Men's Competition
 José Luis de Frutos
 Juan Carlos Rodríguez

Sailing

Men's Competition
 Alejandro Abascal
 Antonio Gorostegui
 Félix Anglada
 Félix Gancedo
 Humberto Costas
 Jesús Turró
 José Luís Doreste
 José María Benavides
 Juan Costas
 Pedro Luís Millet

Shooting

Open

Swimming

Men's Competition
 David López-Zubero 
 Fernando Gómez-Reino
 Jesús Fuentes
 Jorge Comas
 José Bas
 Mario Lloret
 Miguel Lang
 Pedro Balcells
 Santiago Esteva

Women's Competition
 Antonia Real 
 Magda Camps
 Montserrat Majo 
 Rosa Estiarte
 Silvia Fontana

Weightlifting

Men's Competition
 Angel Francisco

References

External links
 Spanish Olympic Committee

Nations at the 1976 Summer Olympics
1976 Summer Olympics
Olympics